This is a list of films about black girlhood. This age group can range from young children to those experiencing adolescence. These depictions are often called coming-of-age stories.

pre-1980s 
Black Girl (1972)

1980-1989 
The Color Purple (1985)
 Polly (1989)

1990-1999
 Flirting (1991)
 Just Another Girl on the I.R.T. (1992)
Sarafina! (1992)
Crooklyn (1994)
Girls Town (1996)
Eve’s Bayou (1997)

2000-2009 
Love & Basketball (2000)
Our Song (2000)
Akeelah and the Bee (2006)
Half Nelson (2006)
Precious (2009)

2010-2019 

 Pariah(2011)
Yelling to the Sky (2011)
 Beasts of the Southern Wild (2012)
Girlhood (2014)
The Fits (2015)
Flowers (2016)
The Girl with All the Gifts (2016)
Queen of Katwe (2016)
For Ahkeem (2017)
I Am Not a Witch (2017)
Everything, Everything (2017)
Roxanne, Roxanne (2017)
Jinn(2018)
Mahalia Melts in the Rain (2018)
Night Comes On (2018)
Rafiki (2018)
Solace (2018)
The Hate U Give (2018)
A Wrinkle in Time (2018)
Jezebel (2019)
Little (2019)
Pick (2019)
Rocks (2019)
Premature (2019)
Selah and the Spades (2019)
See You Yesterday (2019)
The Sun Is Also a Star (2019)
Atlantics (2019)

2020 

 Miss Juneteenth (2020)
Cuties (2020)
Pillars (2020)

See also 
 List of teen films
 Sociology of childhood

References 

Black girlhood
Coming-of-age films
African diaspora
African-American films
Lists of African films